Al-Thuqbah (pronounced ath-Thugba) is one of the historic and most renowned neighborhoods in the city of Al-Khobar in the Eastern Province in Saudi Arabia, with a population of 238,000 in 2010. It was originally constructed by ARAMCO in the early fifties. Due to its location and broad width, Al-Thuqbah is known to be the main entrance to Al-Khobar through Al-Dharan Street, which approaches from Half Moon Beach, connects Al-Khobar to Bahrain, Dammam, and Dhahran, and contains most centers and shopping malls. It is followed by Industrial Thuqbah and Al-Bayoniah District (named after the tradesman Ibn Bayoni).

Name Origin 
The neighborhood was named after a source of water that originated from a small hole previously known as “Al-Thuqb”, which literally translates to “the hole”. People residing near “Al-Thuqb” started linking their address to it. “Al-Thuqb” grew to be the eminent neighborhood now known as Al-Thuqbah.

Government Departments in Al-Thuqbah 

 Al-Thuqbah Police Department
 Al-Khobar Traffic Management Center
 Al-Khobar General Prison Administration 
 Education Administration for males in Al-Khobar
 The commission for promotion of virtue and prevention of vice branch
 Mabarat Al Ehsan Al Khayriyah Charity Center in Al-Khobar
 The Saudi Mail Administration in Al-Khobar
 Al-Khobar Municipality
 Saudi Telecom Administration in Al-Khobar

Hospitals and Health Centers 

 Ibn Alnafees Health Center (governmental)
 Ibn Hayan Health Center (governmental)
 Al-Bayoniah Health Center (governmental)
 Mohammed Aldossary Hospital
 Alyousif Hospital
 Aljazeerah Medical Compound
 Silver Crescent Health Center
 Al-Khobar National Health Center
 Shopping malls and centers
 Venecia mall
 Dossary Towers
 Al Hosson Commercial Center
 Ibn Jumaa Trading Center
 Souq Al Kuwait

Main Roads 

 King Abdullah bin Abdullaziz Road
 King Khalid bin Abdullaziz Road
 King Fahad bin Abdullaziz Road
 Makkah Road
 Riyadh Road
 Fourth Street
 Tenth Street
 Fifteenth Street
 Twentieth Street
 Twenty Fifth Street
 Thirtieth Street
 Al-Khobar Road

Sources
 2004 Saudi Census Figures for the Eastern Province

References

Populated places in Eastern Province, Saudi Arabia
Populated coastal places in Saudi Arabia